The 14th IFTA Film & Drama Awards took place at the Mansion House on 8 April 2017 in Dublin, honouring Irish film and television drama released in 2016. Deirdre O'Kane hosted the film awards ceremony.

Film Awards
The nominations for the IFTA Film & Drama Awards were announced by the Irish Film and Television Academy. Winners are denoted by bold letters.

Film categories
Best Film
A Date for Mad Mary
Love & Friendship
The Journey
The Secret Scripture
The Siege of Jadotville
Tomato Red
The Young Offenders

George Morrison Feature Documentary
Mattress Men
It's Not Yet Dark
In Loco Parentis
Bobby Sands: 66 Days
Atlantic

Best Short Film
Second to None
Define Intervention
Don't Forget the Bread
The Lost Letter

Best Director
Richie Smyth - The Siege of Jadotville
Peter Foott - The Young Offenders
Jim Sheridan - The Secret Scripture
Darren Thornton - A Date for Mad Mary

Script Film
Peter Foott - The Young Offenders
Kevin Brodbin - The Siege of Jadotville
Darren Thornton and Colin Thornton - A Date for Mad Mary
Juanita Wilson - Tomato Red

Lead Actress 
Ruth Negga - Loving
Caoilfhionn Dunne - In View
Seana Kerslake - A Date for Mad Mary
Aisling Loftus - Property of the State
Catherine Walker - A Dark Song

Lead Actor 
Colm Meaney - The Journey
Jamie Dornan -The Siege of Jadotville
Michael Fassbender - The Light Between Oceans
Alex Murphy - The Young Offenders
Mark O'Halloran - History's Future

Best Supporting Actor 
Jason O'Mara - The Siege of Jadotville
Colin Farrell - Fantastic Beasts and Where to Find Them
Brendan Gleeson - Trespass Against Us
Ciaran Hinds - Bleed for This
Chris Walley - The Young Offenders

Best Supporting Actress
Charleigh Bailey - A Date for Mad Mary
Susan Lynch - Bad Day for the Cut
Simone Kirby - Notes on Blindness
Hilary Rose - The Young Offenders
Fiona Shaw - Out of Innocence

Rising Star
Paddy Gibson - Actor
Peter Foott - Director
Barry Keoghan - Actor
Seana Kerslake - Actress

Craft
Best Original Score
Brian Byrne - The Secret Scripture
David Holmes - The Fall
Steve Lynch - An Klondike
Patrick Cassidy - Smalltown

Best Editing 
Nick Emerson - I Am Not a Serial Killer
Colin Campbell - The Young Offenders
Dermot Diskin - The Secret Scripture
Úna Ní Dhonghaíle - The Crown

Best Production Design
Derek Wallace - The Secret Scripture
Mark Geraghty - Vikings
Mark Kelly - An Klondike
Anna Rackard - Love & Friendship

Best Cinematography
Seamus McGarvey - Nocturnal Animals
Piers McGrail - Tomato Red
Robbie Ryan - American Honey
Cathal Watters - An Klondike

Best Costume Design
Consolata Boyle - Florence Foster Jenkins
Joan Bergin - The Secret Scripture
Triona Lillis - An Klondike
Eimer Ní Mhaoldomhnaigh - Love & Friendship

Best Make Up/Hair
Vikings
An Klondike
Love & Friendship
Wrecking the Rising

Best Sound
Tomato Red
The Siege of Jadotville
Game of Thrones
Without Name

Best VFX
The Siege of Jadotville
Black Sails
Ripper Street
Game of Thrones

International categories
International Film
Moonlight
Hacksaw Ridge
La La Land
Manchester by the Sea

International Actor
Casey Affleck - Manchester by the Sea
Andrew Garfield - Hacksaw Ridge
Ryan Gosling - La La Land
Denzel Washington - Fences

International Actress
Emma Stone - La La Land
Amy Adams - Arrival
Viola Davis - Fences
Natalie Portman - Jackie

Television Drama categories
Drama
Vikings
An Klondike
The Fall
Game of Thrones
Smalltown
Striking Out

Director Drama
Dathai Keane - An Klondike
Anthony Byrne - Ripper Street
Ciaran Donnelly - Vikings
Neasa Hardiman - Z: The Beginning of Everything

Script Drama
James Phelan - Wrecking the Rising
Gerard Barrett - Smalltown
Barry Devlin - My Mother and Other Strangers
Marcus Fleming - An Klondike

Actor in a Lead Role in Drama
Cillian Murphy - Peaky Blinders
Dara Devaney - An Klondike
James Nesbitt - The Secret
Aidan Turner - Poldark
Tom Vaughan-Lawlor - Trial of the Century

Actress in a Lead Role in Drama
Amy Huberman - Striking Out
Caitriona Balfe - Outlander
Elaine Cassidy - No Offence
Anne Marie Duff - Murder: The Lost Weekend
Ruth Negga - Preacher

Supporting Actor in a Drama
Ned Dennehy - An Klondike
Liam Cunningham - Game of Thrones
Moe Dunford - Vikings
Andrew Scott - The Hollow Crown
Robert Sheehan - Fortitude

Supporting Actress in a Drama
Charlie Murphy - Happy Valley
Ruth Bradley - HUM∀NS
Sinead Cusack - Call the Midwife
Dominique McElligott - House of Cards
Charlene McKenna - Ripper Street

References

External links
IFTA FILM & DRAMA NOMINEES 2017 at the Irish Film and Television Academy official website

2017 in Irish television
14
2017 film awards
2017 television awards